The Sisodia is an Indian Rajput dynasty belonging to the clan that ruled over the Kingdom of Mewar, in the region of Mewar in Rajasthan. The name of the clan is also transliterated as Sesodia, Shishodia, Sishodia, Shishodya, Sisodya, Sisodiya,
Sisodia.

Origins 

The Sisodia dynasty traced its ancestry to Rahapa, a son of the 12th century Guhila King Ranasimha. He founded the village of Shisoda, in modern day Rajsamand district, as his capital, after which his descendants were called Sisodias. The main branch of the Guhila dynasty ended with their defeat against the Khalji dynasty at the Siege of Chittorgarh (1303). In 1326, Rana Hammir, who belonged to Sisodiya branch, reclaimed control of the region, re-established the dynasty, and also became the founder of the Sisodia dynasty clan, a branch of the Guhila dynasty, to which every succeeding Maharana of Mewar belonged, and the Sisodias regained control of Chittor, the former Guhila capital.

According to the Rajprashasti genealogy, one of these – Samar Singh – married Prithi, the sister of Prithviraj Chauhan. His grandson Rahapa adopted the title Rana (monarch). Rahapa's descendants spent some time at a place called Sisoda, and therefore, came to be known as "Sisodia".

History 

The most notable Sisodia rulers were Rana Hamir (r. 1326–64), Rana Kumbha (r. 1433–68), Rana Sanga (r.1508–1528) and Rana Pratap (r. 1572–97). The Bhonsle clan, to which the Maratha empire's founder Shivaji belonged, also claimed descent from a branch of the royal Sisodia family. Nainsi in his book mentioned Shahji descended from Chacha, son of Rana Lakha. Similarly, Rana dynasty of Nepal also claimed descent from Ranas of Mewar.

According to the Sisodia Chronicles, when the Delhi Sultan Alauddin Khalji attacked Chittorgarh in 1303, the Sisodia men performed Saka (fighting to the death), while their women committed Jauhar (self-immolation in preference to becoming enemy captives). This was repeated twice: when Bahadur Shah of Gujarat besieged Chittorgarh in 1535, and when the Mughal emperor Akbar conquered it in 1567.

Frequent skirmishes with the Mughals greatly reduced the Sisodia power and the size of their kingdom. The Sisodias ultimately accepted the Mughal suzerainty, and some even fought in the Mughal army. However, the art and literary works commissioned by the subsequent Sisodia rulers emphasized their pre-Mughal past. The Sisodias were the last Rajput dynasty to ally with the Mughals, and unlike other Rajput clans, never intermarried with the Mughal imperial family. The Sisodias cultivated an elite identity distinct from other Rajput clans through the poetic legends, eulogies and visual arts commissioned by them. James Tod, an officer of the British East India Company, relied on these works for his book Annals and Antiquities of Rajasthan, or the central and western Rajpoot states of India (1829–1832). His widely read work further helped spread the views of the Sisodias as a superior Rajput clan in colonial and post-colonial India.

Princely States 
 Kingdom of Mewar
 Shahpura State
 Dharampur State
 Dungarpur State
 Barwani State
 Pratapgarh State
 Banswara State
 Deogarh State

List of Rulers 
 Hammir Singh (1326–1364)
 Kshetra Singh (1364–1382)
 Lakha Singh (1382–1421)
 Mokal Singh (1421–1433)
 Rana Kumbha (1433–1468)
 Udai Singh I (1468–1473)
 Rana Raimal (1473–1508)
 Rana Sanga (1508–1527), Under his rule Mewar reached its pinnacle in power and prosperity.
 Ratan Singh II (1528–1531)
 Vikramaditya Singh (1531–1536)
 Vanvir Singh (1536–1540)
 Udai Singh II (1540–1572) 
 Maharana Pratap (1572–1597), 13th king of Mewar, notable for his military resistance against the Mughals.
 Amar Singh I (1597–1620) 
 Karan Singh II (1620–1628)
 Jagat Singh I (1628–1652)
 Raj Singh I (1652–1680)
 Jai Singh (1680–1698)
 Amar Singh II (1698–1710)
 Sangram Singh II (1710–1734)
 Jagat Singh II (1734–1751)
 Pratap Singh II (1751–1754)
 Raj Singh II (1754–1762)
 Ari Singh II (1762–1772)
 Hamir Singh II (1772–1778)
 Bhim Singh (1778–1828)
 Jawan Singh (1828–1838)
 Sardar Singh (1838–1842)
 Swarup Singh (1842–1861)
 Shambhu Singh (1861–1874)
 Sajjan Singh (1874–1884)
 Fateh Singh (1884–1930)
 Bhupal Singh (1930–1947)

Titular Maharanas 

 Bhupal Singh (1947–1955)
 Bhagwat Singh Mewar (1955-1984)
 Mahendra Singh Mewar (1984-Present)
 Arvind Singh Mewar (present)

See also 
 Rajput clans
 Shaktawat
 Chundawat
 Ranawat

References

Further reading

External links 
Sisodia materials in the South Asian American Digital Archive (SAADA)

Rajput clans of Rajasthan
Mewar dynasty
Indian surnames
Social groups of Rajasthan
Suryavansha